Timo Mauer (born 26 May 1997) is a German footballer who plays as a forward for Chemie Leipzig.

References

External links
 

1997 births
Living people
German footballers
Association football forwards
RB Leipzig II players
SC Paderborn 07 players
FC Carl Zeiss Jena players
Chemnitzer FC players
ZFC Meuselwitz players
BSG Chemie Leipzig (1997) players
3. Liga players
Regionalliga players